A tram roundabout or grand circle is a circular rail junction for trams in the shape of a roundabout.  A tram roundabout is able to provide the equivalent any-to-any connection of a grand union, but with a simplified tramway track configuration using one-way traffic, fewer turnouts and reduction in level junctions, at the cost of slightly more space. Trams may continue as one-way traffic in an endless loop around the tram roundabout junction.

A circular roundabout design is often used to allowing passing around a centrally-placed monument, or fountain, or small park.

Standard design

Special variations

Former

On 8 September 1968, one week before closure of Liverpool Corporation Tramways, tram car 245 completed three complete laps of the St. Oswald Street tram roundabout whilst being filmed.

References

Rail junction types